Mussaurus (meaning "mouse lizard") is a genus of herbivorous sauropodomorph dinosaur that lived in southern Argentina during the Sinemurian stage of the Early Jurassic. It receives its name from the small size of the skeletons of juvenile and infant individuals, which were once the only known specimens of the genus. However, since Mussaurus is now known from adult specimens, the name is something of a misnomer. 

In its early stages of life, Mussaurus was a small quadrupedal herbivore, walking on all four legs. As it grew up, the changes in body proportions may have lead its centre of mass to move backwards towards its pelvis.

Numerous specimens of varying age found in a single locality suggest that Mussaurus is one of the earliest dinosaurs to have lived in a gregarious lifestyle. With its possible origin from the Triassic, this complex social behaviour may have given rise to the sauropods' early success as the largest herbivores on land. Mussaurus also possessed anatomical features that suggest a close, possibly transitional evolutionary relationship with true sauropods.

Discovery
Infant and juvenile fossils of Mussaurus were first discovered by an expedition led by Jose Bonaparte during the 1970s to the Laguna Colorada Formation, where the team found fossilized eggs and hatchlings, which added insight into the reproductive strategies of Mussaurus and other sauropodomorph dinosaurs. The age of the formation is estimated between 192.78 ± 0.14 Ma and 192.74 ± 0.14 Ma. The first adult specimens of Mussaurus were described in 2013, although some of these specimens had first been described in 1980 and were originally attributed to the genus Plateosaurus.

Classification
Previous to the discovery of adult specimens of Mussaurus, the phylogenetic position of this taxon was difficult to establish. Infant and juvenile fossils are known to show more basal traits than adult specimens of the same taxon. Furthermore, the recently discovered of one subadult and three adult specimens assigned to Mussaurus are more complete than other material assigned to it. Therefore, a cladistic analysis of basal sauropodomorphs performed by Otero and Pol (2013) to test the phylogenetic relationships of Mussaurus, included information only from adult specimens. The following cladogram is simplified after their analysis (relationships outside Plateosauria are not shown).

Palaeobiology

Mussaurus specimens have been found in association with nests that are believed to contain multiple eggs apiece. This is about the size of a small lizard. Juveniles differed from adults in proportion in addition to size and mass. As is common for dinosaurs, juvenile Mussaurus had tall skulls with short snouts and large eyes. These proportions are common in many infant vertebrates and are often associated with species that provide parental care during the vulnerable early stages of life. Adults are expected to have longer snouts and necks, as typical in early sauropodomorphs.

Social behaviour
As of 2021, Mussaurus represents the earliest unequivocal evidence of complex social behaviour in dinosaurs, with over 100 eggs and skeletal specimens of 80 individuals ranging from embryos to adults found in the same locality. This discovery predates the previous records of herd-living dinosaurs by at least 40 million years. It is thought that this behaviour has been originated from the Triassic period, leading them to become successful as large terrestrial herbivores.

Growth

M. patagonicus probably a was quadruped, walking on all four limbs. Changes in the relative proportions of its body during growth (ontogeny) may have caused its centre of mass to move backwards towards its pelvis, resulting in the animal adopting a two-legged (bipedal) stance later in life. It is estimated that Mussaurus would have been sexually mature at 23 to 31 years of age, and reached somatic maturity after 14 years.

References

Further reading

External links

Sauropodomorphs
Dinosaur genera
Norian life
Late Triassic dinosaurs of South America
Fossils of Argentina
Triassic Argentina
Fossil taxa described in 1979
Taxa named by José Bonaparte